The Okmulgee Downtown Historic District is the original downtown area of Okmulgee, Oklahoma, roughly bounded by 4th Street, 8th Street, Okmulgee Avenue, and the Frisco tracks.  It was added to the National Register of Historic Places on December 17, 1992.

History
The district comprises 41 blocks, 9 of which were identified in a Phase I survey, and 32 in a Phase 2 survey, both conducted in 1990.  The district includes 151 contributing structures, while many of the remaining 46 structures could be contributing if intrusive sheeting elements were to be removed. The buildings range from the Creek National Capitol, built in 1878, to the five- to eight-story buildings constructed during the late 1910s and the 1920s of the oil boom. The predominant architectural style of the district is Early Commercial, but some other represented styles are Renaissance Revival, Richardsonian Romanesque, Italian Renaissance Revival, Second Renaissance Revival, Spanish Colonial Revival, Neoclassical Revival, Beaux Arts, Italianate, and Art Deco.  The district includes the predominantly African-American commercial area which built up on 5th & 6th Streets.

The Okmulgee Historic Preservation Commission was established in 1988 as part of that Historic Preservation Ordinance passed by the town's City Council to provide protection to the district.  The Commission oversees architectural changes within the area.

At least one subsequent architectural survey has identified other districts and structures in Okmulgee which might qualify for historical listing, but no action has been taken.

Selected buildings within the district include:
Selfridge Flats, 321 E. 7th
Walker Apartments, at 220 S. Porter
a brick apartment building at 207 W. 8th
a boarding house, once used as a railroad hotel (noncontributing)
Severs Block, 101 E. 6th Street, separately listed on the National Register in 1991
building at 104 S. Morton
Parkinson-Trent Company Building, 100 S. Morton
old Okmulgee City Hall, 115 N. Morton
Salvation Army Citadel, 213 S. Grand
Creek National Capitol, Italianate in style, separately NRHP-listed and a National Historic Landmark
McCulloch Building, 108-114 N. Grand
Cook/Orpheum Theater, 210 W. 7th
Bank of Commerce, 110 E. 6th St., Neoclassical Revival-style
Christian Church, 211 W. 8th Street, Late Gothic Revival-style
Commerce Building, 117-121 S. Grand, Beaux Arts-style
Okmulgee County Courthouse, separately NRHP-listed in 1984

References

Geography of Okmulgee County, Oklahoma
National Historic Landmarks in Oklahoma
National Register of Historic Places in Okmulgee County, Oklahoma
Buildings and structures completed in 1878
Historic districts on the National Register of Historic Places in Oklahoma